White People Party Music is the second studio album by American rapper and comedian Nick Cannon. It was released on April 1, 2014, by  N'Credible Entertainment and distributed by RED Distribution. The album is the follow-up to his debut album Nick Cannon (2003).

The album was supported by three singles; "Me Sexy", "Dance Floor" (which heavily contains a sample of "Feelin' on Yo Booty" performed by R. Kelly), and "Looking for a Dream".

Track listing

References

2014 albums
Nick Cannon albums

Hip house albums
RED Distribution albums